Guy Sparrow may refer to:
Guy Sparrow (basketball) (born 1932), former NBA basketball player
Guy Sparrow (cricketer) (1877–1958), English cricket player